Cipla Limited (stylized as Cipla) is an Indian multinational pharmaceutical company, headquartered in Mumbai. Cipla primarily develops medicines to treat respiratory disease, cardiovascular disease, arthritis, diabetes, depression, and many other medical conditions.

Cipla has 47 manufacturing locations across the world and sells its products in 86 countries. It is the third largest drug producer in India.

History 
In 1935, Cipla was founded by Khwaja Abdul Hamied as 'The Chemical, Industrial & Pharmaceutical Laboratories' in Mumbai.
In July 1984, the name of the company was changed to 'Cipla Limited'.

In 1985, the US FDA approved the company's bulk drug against HIV and other drugs to treat poor people in the developing world.
Led by the founder's son Yusuf Hamied, a Cambridge-educated chemist, the company provided generic AIDS and other drugs to treat poor people in the developing world.
In 1995, Cipla launched Deferiprone, the world's first oral iron chelator. In 2001, Cipla offered antiretrovirals for HIV treatment at a fractional cost (less than $350 per year per patient).

In 2013 Cipla acquired the South African company Cipla-Medpro, kept it as a subsidiary, and changed its name to Cipla Medpro South Africa Limited.  At the time of the acquisition, Cipla-Medpro had been a distribution partner for Cipla and was South Africa's third-biggest pharmaceutical company. The company had been founded in 2002 and was known as Enaleni Pharmaceuticals Ltd.  In 2005, Enaleni bought all the shares of Cipla-Medpro, which had been a joint venture between Cipla and Medpro Pharmaceuticals, a South African generics company, and in 2008 it changed its name to Cipla-Medpro.

In September 2015, Cipla acquired InvaGen Pharmaceuticals and Exelan Pharmaceuticals, two American pharmaceutical companies, for 555 million dollars.

In 2019 Cipla entered digital therapeutics by partnering with Wellthy Therapeutics in India and Brandmed in South Africa.

Products and services
Cipla sells active pharmaceutical ingredients to other manufacturers as well as pharmaceutical and personal care products, including escitalopram oxalate (anti-depressant), lamivudine, and fluticasone propionate. They are the world's largest manufacturer of antiretroviral drugs.

In July 2020, the company announced the introduction of Gilead Sciences' Remdesivir under the brand name CIPREMI in India after reaching a voluntary licensing agreement with parent company and DCGI approval for "restricted emergency use" in COVID-19 treatment of critical confirmed patients.

Operations

Cipla has 34 manufacturing units in 8 locations across India and a presence in over 80 countries. Exports accounted for 48%  of its revenue for FY 2013–14. Cipla spent 517 crore (5.4% of their revenue) in FY 2013–14 on R&D activities. The primary focus areas for R&D were development of new formulations, drug-delivery systems and APIs (active pharmaceutical ingredients). Cipla also cooperates with other enterprises in areas such as consulting, commissioning, engineering, project appraisal, quality control, know-how transfer, support, and plant supply.

As on 31 March 2013, the company had 22,036 employees (out of which 2,455 were women (7.30%) and 23 were employees with disabilities (0.1%)). During the FY 2013–14, the company incurred  on employee benefit expenses.

Listings and Shareholding

The equity shares of Cipla are listed on the Bombay Stock Exchange, where it is a constituent of the BSE SENSEX index, and the National Stock Exchange of India, where it is a constituent of the CNX Nifty. Its Global Depository Receipts (GDRs) are listed on the Luxembourg Stock Exchange.
 
As of 31 December 2022, the promoter group, Y. K. Hamied and his family, hold around 33.61% equity shares in Cipla. Individual shareholders hold approximately 14.72% of its shares. SBI Mutual Fund, LIC etc. are the largest non-promoter shareholders in the Company.

Awards and recognitions
 In 2012, Cipla received the Thomson Reuters India Innovation Award.
 Cipla won Dun & Bradstreet American Express Corporate Awards in 2006.
 In 2007, Forbes included Cipla in the 200 'Best under a billion' list of best small Asian companies.
 In 1980, Cipla won Chemexcil Award for Excellence for exports.
 In 2015, Cipla stood third in the India's Most Reputed Brands (Pharmaceutical) list, in a study conducted by BlueBytes, a leading Media Analytics firm in association with TRA Research, a brand insights organization (both a part of the Comniscient Group).

Criticism

Emergency contraception
In August 2007, Cipla launched an emergency contraception drug "i-pill" sold over the counter, which was controversial with regard to its being available without a prescription and the large amount of drug contained per dose.

Generic drugs
In the late 1960s, Cipla began manufacturing a new, patented drug, propranolol, without the permission of the drug's patent holder, Imperial Chemical Industries (ICI), who protested to the Indian government. The CEO of Cipla pressured the government of Indira Gandhi to change India's patent laws to eliminate patents that directly covered drugs, and instead to allow only patents that covered methods to make drugs. so that Cipla could go ahead and produce as many low-priced generic drugs for the poor as possible. Since then Cipla has also produced a low-cost drug to treat HIV, and expanded operations into several developing countries, including African nations, where most HIV and poor patients existed at one time. But the changes made led to criticism of both India's patent laws and Cipla. India reinstated patents on drugs in 2005.

See also

 Pharmaceutical industry in India
 Generic drug
 List of pharmaceutical companies

References

External links
 

Biotechnology companies of India
Pharmaceutical companies of India
Pharmaceutical companies established in 1935
NIFTY 50
Biopharmaceutical companies
Indian brands
Indian companies established in 1935
Companies listed on the National Stock Exchange of India
Companies listed on the Bombay Stock Exchange